Sakıb Aytaç (born 24 November 1991) is a Turkish footballer who plays for TFF Second League club Esenler Erokspor.

Club career
On 1 July 2018, after finishing his contract with Antalyaspor, he joined Kayserispor.

References

External links

1991 births
Footballers from İzmir
Living people
Turkish footballers
Turkey youth international footballers
Turkey under-21 international footballers
Association football defenders
Gençlerbirliği S.K. footballers
Denizlispor footballers
TKİ Tavşanlı Linyitspor footballers
Antalyaspor footballers
Kayserispor footballers
Yeni Malatyaspor footballers
Kasımpaşa S.K. footballers
Süper Lig players
TFF First League players
TFF Second League players